Chevron Mountain is a summit in Alberta, Canada.

Chevron Mountain was named for the fact it resembles a chevron.

References

Two-thousanders of Alberta
Alberta's Rockies